Space Shanty is the debut and only album by the short-lived Canterbury scene band Khan. Steve Hillage's first solo album, Fish Rising, included material originally intended for the second album by Khan, but the band split up before that was a possibility.

Track listing

Personnel
Band
 Steve Hillage – guitars, vocals
 Nick Greenwood – bass guitar, vocals
 Eric Peachey – drums
 Dave Stewart – organ, piano, celesta, marimbas

Production
 David Anstey – sleeve design
 Pete Booth – engineer
 George Chkiantz – engineer
 Dave Grinstead – remixing
 Neil Slaven – producer
 Derek Varnals – engineer, remixing

References

1972 debut albums
Deram Records albums